Ernst Dernburg (born Erich Wilhelm Franz Hermann Calow; 4 April 1887 – 23 September 1969) was a German stage and film actor.

Selected filmography
The Sacrifice (1918)
 The Living Dead (1919)
 The Marquise of Armiani (1920)
 Demon Blood (1920)
 Indian Revenge (1921)
 The Flight into Death (1921)
 The Demon of Kolno (1921)
 Sunken Worlds (1922)
 The Love Story of Cesare Ubaldi (1922)
 Hannele's Journey to Heaven (1922)
 I.N.R.I. (1923)
 The Second Shot (1923)
 The Royal Grenadiers (1925)
 The Iron Bride (1925)
 Their Last Love Affair (1927)
 The Tiger Murder Case (1930)
 The Rhineland Girl (1930)
 Father and Son (1930)
 1914 (1931)
 The Woman They Talk About (1931)
 The Captain from Köpenick (1931)
 The Invisible Front (1932)
 Between Two Hearts (1934)
 The Irresistible Man (1937)
 Carousel (1937)
 A Prussian Love Story (1938)
 Dance on the Volcano (1938)
 D III 88 (1939)
 Robert Koch (1939)
 The Star of Rio (1940)
 Friedemann Bach (1941)
 Wedding in Barenhof (1942)
 Melody of a Great City (1943)
 Insolent and in Love (1948)
 Don't Ask My Heart (1952)

References

Bibliography
 Giesen, Rolf. Nazi Propaganda Films: A History and Filmography. McFarland, 2003.

External links

1887 births
1969 deaths
German male stage actors
German male silent film actors
German male film actors
Male actors from Berlin
20th-century German male actors